The Women's team table tennis - Class 1-3 tournament at the 2012 Summer Paralympics in London took place from 5 September to 7 September 2012 at ExCeL Exhibition Centre. Classes 1-3 were for athletes with a physical impairment that affects their legs, and who compete in a sitting position. The lower the number, the greater the impact the impairment was on an athlete's ability to compete.

Bracket

Results

First round

Quarter-finals

Semifinals

Finals
Gold medal match

Third place match

References

WT01-03
Para